Dagmar Boom (born 1 May 2000) is a Dutch volleyball player, who plays as a receiver/libero. She is a member of the Women's National Team. She plays for Talent Team Papendal.

She participated in the 2017 Montreux Volley Masters, and 2018 FIVB Volleyball Women's World Championship.

References

External links 
 FIVB profile
 CEV profile
 https://www.flovolleyball.tv/articles/5066163-5-reasons-to-watch-the-2017-montreux-volley-masters

2000 births
Living people
Dutch women's volleyball players
People from Hoorn
Sportspeople from North Holland